Cherukallayi is a revenue village which forms a part of  Mahé municipality of Puducherry, India.

Geography 
Cherukkallayi also known as Cherukallay kunnu locally is a hill in Mahe. The view from the top of the hill is impressive. You can see parts of Mahe, The Mahe Church tower, The Arabian sea and the Mahe river.

Kallai Pandakkal Road passes through Cherukallayi connecting it to the National Highway at Mahé .

Notable places 
 St. George Fort built during the French period is situated on the highest hill point on Cherukallayi hill. This is a private place and you may need appropriate permissions to visit.
 The Prasar Bharathi's Doordarshan Terrestrial Relay antenna is placed at the top of this hill.

References 

 

Villages in Mahe district